The U.S. Senate Environment and Public Works Subcommittee on Clean Air, Climate and Nuclear Safety is a subcommittee of the U.S. Senate Committee on Environment and Public Works.

History
The subcommittee was formerly known as the Subcommittee on Clean Air, Climate Change, and Nuclear Safety, but was renamed during committee organization of the 110th Congress, after responsibility over global warming issues transferred to the Subcommittees on Public Sector Solutions and Subcommittee on Private Sector Solutions to Global Warming.  The subcommittee still retains some inherent oversight over global warming issues due to its jurisdiction over the federal Clean Air Act.

Jurisdiction
Clean Air Issues
 Environmental Protection Agency’s Office of Air and Radiation (OAR)
 Clean Air Act
 Indoor Air
 Air pollution
Nuclear Issues
 Nuclear Regulatory Commission
 Nuclear Plant Safety
 Nonmilitary environmental regulation and control of nuclear energy
Other issues
 Tennessee Valley Authority

Members, 118th Congress

References

External links
Official subcommittee Page

Air pollution organizations
Environment Clean Air